The Olympic Diploma of Merit was an award given by the International Olympic Committee (IOC) to recognise outstanding services to sports or a notable contribution to the Olympic Games. By 1974, the last time the awards were granted, just 58 people had received the award.

History
Pierre de Coubertin, the originator of the modern Olympic Games, created the honour during the Brussels Olympic Congress of 1905 for those who had made outstanding services to sports or to those who had a major contribution in promoting the Olympic ideals. Strangely, at the 1908 Summer Olympics in London, where red, blue and yellow vouchers were exchanged by the first three athletes for gold, silver and bronze medals respectively, a non-winning competitor's blue voucher could be exchanged for a 'Diploma of Merit' (equivalent of the Olympic Diploma).  Sports people who have won the award include Englishman Jack Beresford, winner of medals at five successive Olympics, Dane Ivan Osiier who took part in seven Olympic Games over 28 years, missing the 1936 Games as a protest against Nazism and Frenchman Jean Borotra, Olympic bronze medallist in the Men's Doubles in 1924, winner of four different tennis Grand Slam titles and founder of the International Fair Play Committee.

Sports administrators and promoters who have received the award include Sir Herbert Macdonald, four-time team manager for the Jamaican Olympic Team, and Sir Stanley Rous, former Secretary of The Football Association and the 6th President of FIFA (and one of the last three winners along with Jean Borotra).  The award has also gone to those working in the arts: architect Kenzō Tange received the award for his design of the Japanese National Gymnasium for the 1964 Olympics, and film director Kon Ichikawa received one for his celebrated, athlete-focused 1965 documentary film Tokyo Olympiad ((Tōkyō Orinpikku)).

The IOC discontinued the Olympic Diploma of Merit, and three other awards, at the 75th IOC session in 1974. The two extant awards are the Olympic Order, created in 1975 for distinguished contributions to the Olympic movement, and the Olympic Cup, instituted in 1906 by Coubertin for organisations with a record of support for the Olympics and presented annually.

List of Olympic Diploma of Merit awards
A listing of all 57 recipients:

References

Further reading
 IA
 Olympic Diploma of Merit, olympedia.org

Olympic culture
Sports trophies and awards